Mushrooms can be used to create color dyes via color-extraction with a solvent (often ammonia) as well as particulation of raw material. The shingled hedgehog mushroom and related species contain blue-green pigments, which are used for dyeing wool in Norway. The fruiting body of Hydnellum peckii can be used to produce a beige color when no mordant is used, and shades of blue or green depending on the mordant added. Phaeolus schweinitzii produces green, yellow, gold, or brown colors, depending on the material dyed and the mordant used.

See also
Aspergillus oryzae, Saccharomyces cerevisiae, Saccharomyces boulardii 
Mycelium
Mycofiltration
Mycorrhiza - Arbuscular, Ecto, Ericoid

References 

Fungi and humans
Natural dyes